Lappoli is a surname. Notable people with the surname include:

Matteo Lappoli, (1450–1504), Italian painter
Giovanni Antonio Lappoli (1492–1552), Italian painter
 

Italian-language surnames